Nordine Kandil (born 31 October 2001) is a French professional footballer who plays as a midfielder for Strasbourg.

Club career
A youth product of Strasbourg since the age of 5, Kandil signed his first professional contract with the club on 14 May 2021. He made his professional debut with Strasbourg in a 5–1 Ligue 1 win over Saint-Étienne on 17 October 2021, coming on as a late sub in the 81st minute and assisted his side's 5th goal.

Personal life
Born in France, Kandil is of Moroccan descent.

References

External links
 

2001 births
Living people
Footballers from Strasbourg
French footballers
French sportspeople of Moroccan descent
Association football midfielders
RC Strasbourg Alsace players
Ligue 1 players
Championnat National 3 players